Nikolas Tombazis (born 22 April 1968 in Athens, Greece) is a racing car designer who has worked in Formula One since 1992 for the Benetton, McLaren, and Ferrari teams.

Tombazis graduated with a degree in engineering in 1989 from Trinity College at Cambridge University followed by a PhD in aeronautical engineering from Imperial College London in 1992.

In November 1992, he became aerodynamicist at the Benetton Formula 1 team and was promoted to Head of Aerodynamics in 1994.
Three years later he moved to the Scuderia Ferrari, where, in 1998, he became Head of Aerodynamics and CFD.

In 2004 he returned to England to work with McLaren, where he started working in a similar position and later being promoted to Head of Planning.

In March 2006, he was back at Ferrari, this time as Chief Designer. He left Ferrari on 16 December 2014.

On 15 January 2016, the Manor Formula 1 team appointed Tombazis as its chief aerodynamicist.

Following the closure of Manor, he set up his own consultancy, called MAA, and has been a visiting professor of aerodynamics for Imperial College London.

On 6 March 2018, it was announced that Tombazis has joined the FIA to become its 'head of single-seater technical matters'.

On 18 January 2023, it was announced that Tombazis had been placed in the role of ‘Single Seater Director’ before the 2023 Formula One Season.

Career
1992–1993: Benetton Formula aerodynamicist
1993–1995: Benetton Formula chief aerodynamicist
1997: Scuderia Ferrari aerodynamicist
1998–2003: Scuderia Ferrari chief aerodynamicist
2004: McLaren chief aerodynamicist
2005: McLaren project chief director
2006–2014: Scuderia Ferrari chief designer
2016-2017: Manor F1 Team chief aerodynamicist
2018–2023: FIA Head of Single Seater Technical Matters
2023–present: FIA Single Seater Director

Personal life
Tombazis lived in Castelnuovo Rangone (Modena) together with his wife and four children. He then moved to Greece for three years. Following this period, the Tombazis family moved to Geneva, where he still resides, for his position at the FIA. He is the son of well-known Greek architect Alexandros Tombazis. In his free time, Tombazis has said that he enjoys sculpture and spending quality, creative time with his family, playing Catan and Monopoly.

References

External links
 Official formula1.com information about Nikolas Tombazis
 Scuderia Ferrari Official Site information about Nikolas Tombazis
 FerrariWorld Interview
 Grandprix.com information about Nikolas Tombazis

1968 births
Living people
Engineers from Athens
Ferrari people
Aerodynamicists
Formula One designers
Greek motorsport people
Alumni of Imperial College London
Greek automobile designers
Alumni of Trinity College, Cambridge
Benetton Formula